Danny Pearson may refer to:
Danny Pearson (musician) (1953–2018), American composer and singer-songwriter
Danny Pearson (politician) (born 1973), Australian politician
Danny Pearson (OITNB), a character on Orange Is the New Black

See also
Dan Pearson (disambiguation)
Daniel Pearson (disambiguation)